The women's 200 metres T37 event at the 2020 Summer Paralympics in Tokyo, took place on 27 August 2021.

Records
Prior to the competition, the existing records were as follows:

Results

Heats
Heat 1 took place on 27 August 2021, at 11:37:

Heat 2 took place on 27 August 2021, at 11:44:

Final
The final took place on 27 August 2021, at 19:16:

References

Women's 200 metres T37
2021 in women's athletics